Polyommatus iphigenia is a butterfly of the family Lycaenidae. It was described by Gottlieb August Wilhelm Herrich-Schäffer in 1847. 
It is found in the Balkans and Asia Minor.

Subspecies

P. i. iphigenia Anatolia
P. i. araratensis  (de Lesse, 1957) Turkey
P. i. nonacriensis  (Brown, 1976) Greece
P. i. manuelae  Eckweiler & Schurian, 2013

Description from Seitz

Polyommatus  iphigenia H.-Schaff. (81i) is again similar to damon, above more greenish blue, with broad black border, the costal and apical areas of the hindwing also being black. The underside is paler and has smaller ocelli. Asia Minor and Persia.

Biology
The larvae feed on Onobrychis species

Etymology

Named in the classical tradition for Iphigenia.

References

Butterflies described in 1847
Polyommatus
Butterflies of Europe
Butterflies of Asia